Bruno Leonel Cabrera (born 28 April 1997) is an Argentine professional footballer who plays as an defender for Chilean club Coquimbo Unido.

Club career
Next he played for Barracas Central, getting the promotion to the Argentine top division in 2021.

In 2022, he moved abroad and joined Club Nacional in the Paraguayan Primera División.

In December 2022, he signed with Chilean Primera División side Coquimbo Unido.

References

External links
 
 

1997 births
Living people
Footballers from La Plata
Argentine footballers
Association football defenders
Argentine expatriate footballers
Torneo Argentino A players
Primera Nacional players
Estudiantes de La Plata footballers
Barracas Central players
Paraguayan Primera División players
Club Nacional footballers
Chilean Primera División players
Coquimbo Unido footballers
Expatriate footballers in Paraguay
Argentine expatriate sportspeople in Paraguay
Expatriate footballers in Chile
Argentine expatriate sportspeople in Chile